The 1998 Lignes Aériennes Congolaises crash was a non-scheduled domestic Kindu–Kinshasa passenger service that was shot down by rebel forces, just after takeoff from Kindu Airport, during climbout, on 10 October 1998. All 41 occupants of the aircraft perished in the incident.

Aircraft
The aircraft involved was a Lignes Aériennes Congolaises Boeing 727-30, registration 9Q-CSG, that had its maiden flight on 10 March 1965. It was delivered new to Lufthansa, before serving Condor until 1981. From there the aircraft was operated by the Royal Oman Police Air Wing under registration A40-CF. In 1993 it was now operated by Seagreen Airlines and later the same year by Shabair under registration 9Q-CSG. In 1994, it was acquired by New ACS before ultimately transfeering to Lignes Aériennes Congolaises in 1997.  The airframe was  years old at the time of the crash.

Description of the event
The Lignes Aériennes Congolaises Boeing 727-30 took off from Kindu Airport (KND/FZOA) on a domestic non-scheduled passenger flight to N'djili Airport in Kinshasa with 38 passengers and 3 crew on board. Only 3 minutes into the flight, the rear of the aircraft was struck by a Russian-made shoulder-fired Strela 2 surface-to-air missile. The captain attempted an emergency landing, but the 727 crashed into a dense jungle near Kindu. All 41 people on board perished.

References

Mass murder in 1998
Aviation accidents and incidents in 1998
Aviation accidents and incidents in the Democratic Republic of the Congo
Accidents and incidents involving the Boeing 727
Airliner shootdown incidents
1998 in the Democratic Republic of the Congo
Massacres in the Democratic Republic of the Congo
Second Congo War
20th-century aircraft shootdown incidents
October 1998 events in Africa